Francis Maloney may refer to:

Francis Maloney (rugby league) (born 1973), English rugby league player
Francis T. Maloney (1894–1945), American politician; U.S. Representative from Connecticut

See also
 Frank Maloney (disambiguation)
 Frances Moloney (1873–1959) Irish socialite, later Sister Mary Patrick of the Missionary Sisters of St. Columban